Bernard "Barney" Jean Wilen (4 March 1937 – 25 May 1996) was a French tenor and soprano saxophonist and jazz composer.

Life
Wilen was born in Nice, France; his father was an American dentist turned inventor, and his mother was French. He began performing in clubs in Nice after being encouraged by Blaise Cendrars who was a friend of his mother. His career was boosted in 1957, when he worked with Miles Davis on the soundtrack for the Louis Malle film Ascenseur pour l'Échafaud (Elevator to the Gallows). In 1959, Wilen wrote his soundtrack Un Témoin Dans la Ville and studio album Jazz sur scène with Kenny Clarke. He wrote a soundtrack for Roger Vadim's film Les Liaisons Dangereuses two years later, working with Thelonious Monk. Wilen returned to composing for French films in the 1980s and 1990s. In the mid-to-late 1960s, he became interested in rock, and recorded an album dedicated to Timothy Leary. Wilen toured in Japan for the first time in 1990. He also worked with punk rockers before returning to jazz in the 1990s. Wilen played with modern jazz musicians until his death in 1996. He died of cancer in Paris at the age of 59.

In 1987, French comic book artist Jacques de Loustal and author Philippe Paringaux paid homage to Wilen in their "bande dessinée" Barney et la note bleue ("Barney and the blue note").

Discography

As leader
 Tilt (Swing, 1957)
 Barney Wilen Quintet (Guild du Jazz, 1957)
 Un Temoin Dans La Ville (Fontana, 1959)
 Barney (RCA, 1960)
 Zodiac (Vogue, 1966)
 Auto Jazz: Tragic Destiny of Lorenzo Bandini (MPS, 1968) - with drummer Eddy Gaumont.
 Moshi (Saravah, 1972)
 French Ballads (IDA, 1987)
 La Note Bleue (IDA, 1987)
 Wild Dogs of the Ruwenzori (IDA, 1989)
 Movie Themes from France with Mal Waldron (Timeless, 1990)
 French Story with Mal Waldron (Alfa, 1990)
 Paris Moods (Alfa, 1990)
 Sanctuary (IDA, 1991)
 Newport '59 (Fresh Sound, 1991)
 Modern Nostalgie: Starbust Forever (Alfa, 1992)
 Le Grand Cirque (Wan+Wan, 1992)
 Dream Time with Alain Jean-Marie (Deux Z, 1992)
 Inside Nitty=Gritty (Venus, 1993)
 Essential Ballads (Alfa, 1993)
 New York Romance (Venus, 1994)
 Passione (Venus, 1995)
 Talisman (IDA, 1994)
 More from Barney at the Club Saint-Germain (RCA Victor, 1997)
 Besame Mucho (Venus, 1997)
 Double Action with Jimmy Gourley (Elabeth, 1999)
 The Osaka Concert (Trema/RTE, 1999)
 Eje Thelin 1996 with Barney Willen (Dragon, 2003)
 Flash Back with Philippe Petit (Paris Jazz Corner, 2003)
 Le Jardin Aux Sentiers Qui Bifurquent (CELP, 2004)
 Live in Paris 8 Janvier 1983 (Marge, 2007)
 Jazz in Camera with Donald Byrd (Sonorama, 2012)
 Four Brothers with Lucky Thompson (Sonorama, 2015)
 Live in Tokyo '91 (Elemental Music, 2019)

As sideman
With Art Blakey and The Jazz Messengers
 Les Liaisons Dangereuses 1960 (Fontana, 1960)
 Blakey in Paris (Epic, 1961)
 Paris Jam Session (Gitanes Jazz, 2000)

With Bud Powell
 Cookin' at Saint-Germain 57-59 (Mythic Sound, 1989)
 Groovin' at the Blue Note 59-61 (Mythic Sound, 1989)
 Paris Sessions (Pablo, 2002)
 Parisian Thoroughfares (Pablo, 2003)
 Shaw Nuff (EPM/Xanadu, 1979)

With others
 Chet Baker, Gerry Mulligan, Bud Powell, Clark Terry, Europa Jazz (Europa Jazz 1981)
 Jay Cameron, Jay Cameron's International Sax-Band (Swing 1955)
 Franco Cerri, International Jazz Meeting (Columbia, 1961)
 Gil Cuppini, What's New? Vol. 2 (Meazzi Edizioni, 1961)
 Miles Davis, Ascenseur pour l'échafaud (Fontana, 1958)
 Miles Davis, Jazz Track (Columbia, 1959)
 Leo Ferre, Francofolies La Fete a Ferre Enregistrement Public a La Rochelle (EPM, 1988)
 George Gruntz, Jazz Sound-Track from Mental Cruelty (Decca, 1960)
 Lars Gullin, The Liquid Moves of Lars Gullin Lost Jazz Files 1959–1963 (Sonorama, 2016)
 Roy Haynes, Roy Haynes Modern Group (Swing 1955)
 John Lewis & Sacha Distel, Afternoon in Paris (Atlantic, 1957)
 Thelonious Monk, Les Liaisons Dangereuses 1960 (Sam, Saga 2017)
 Marie Moor, Aigre-Douce (Global 1993)
 Stevie Nicks, Rock a Little (Modern, 1985)
 Jacques Pelzer, Never Let Me Go (Igloo, 1990)
 Francois Tusques, Le Nouveau Jazz (Mouloudji, 1967)
 Rene Urtreger, Collection Privee Extraits De Concerts (Carlyne Music, 1982)

References

External links

[ All Music]
Official Barney Wilen website

Jazz tenor saxophonists
People from Nice
French jazz saxophonists
Male saxophonists
French jazz composers
Male jazz composers
1937 births
1996 deaths
Hard bop saxophonists
20th-century French composers
20th-century saxophonists
20th-century French male musicians
Sunnyside Records artists
MPS Records artists
20th-century jazz composers